In linguistic typology, a subject–object–verb (SOV) language is one in which the subject, object, and verb of a sentence always or usually appear in that order. If English were SOV, "Sam beer drank" would be an ordinary sentence, as opposed to the actual Standard English "Sam drank beer" which is subject–verb–object (SVO).

The term is often loosely used for ergative languages like Adyghe and Basque that really have agents instead of subjects.

Incidence

Among natural languages with a word order preference, SOV is the most common type (followed by subject–verb–object; the two types account for more than 87% of natural languages with a preferred order).

Languages that have SOV structure include all Indo-Iranian languages (Assamese, Bengali, Gujarati, Hindi, Marathi, Nepali, Pāli, Pashto, Persian, Punjabi, Sindhi, Sinhalese, Urdu, Zazaki, Kurdish), Ainu, Akkadian, Amharic, Armenian, Assyrian, Aymara, Basque, Burmese, Burushaski, Cherokee, Dakota, Dogon languages, Elamite, Ancient Greek, Hajong, Hittite, Hopi, Ijoid languages, Itelmen, Japanese, Hachijo,
Ryukyuan,
Korean, Classical Latin, Lakota, Manchu, Mande languages, Meeteilon, Mongolian, Navajo, Newari, Nivkh, Nobiin, Omaha, Quechua, Senufo languages, Seri, Sicilian, Sunuwar, Somali and virtually all other Cushitic languages, Sumerian, Tibetan and nearly all other Tibeto-Burman languages, Kannada, Malayalam, Tamil, Telugu and all other Dravidian languages, Tigrinya, Turkic languages, almost all Uto-Aztecan languages, Yukaghir, Zazaki and virtually all Caucasian languages.

Standard Mandarin is generally SVO but common constructions with verbal complements require SOV or OSV. Some Romance languages are SVO, but when the object is an enclitic pronoun, word order allows for SOV (see the examples below). German and Dutch are considered SVO in conventional typology and SOV in generative grammar. They can be considered SOV but with V2 word order as an overriding rule for the finite verb in main clauses, which results in SVO in some cases and SOV in others. For example, in German, a basic sentence such as "Ich sage etwas über Karl" ("I say something about Karl") is in SVO word order. Non-finite verbs are placed at the end, however, since V2 only applies to the finite verb: "Ich will etwas über Karl sagen" ("I want to say something about Karl"). In a subordinate clause, the finite verb is not affected by V2, and also appears at the end of the sentence, resulting in full SOV order: "Ich sage, dass Karl einen Gürtel gekauft hat." (Word-for-word: "I say that Karl a belt bought has.")

A rare example of SOV word order in English is "I (subject) thee (object) wed (verb)" in the wedding vow "With this ring, I thee wed."

Properties
SOV languages have a strong tendency to use postpositions rather than prepositions, to place auxiliary verbs after the action verb, to place genitive noun phrases before the possessed noun, to place a name before a title or honorific ("James Uncle" and "Johnson Doctor" rather than "Uncle James" and "Doctor Johnson") and to have subordinators appear at the end of subordinate clauses. They have a weaker but significant tendency to place demonstrative adjectives before the nouns they modify. Relative clauses preceding the nouns to which they refer usually signals SOV word order, but the reverse does not hold: SOV languages feature prenominal and postnominal relative clauses roughly equally. SOV languages also seem to exhibit a tendency towards using a time–manner–place ordering of adpositional phrases.

In linguistic typology, one can usefully distinguish two types of SOV languages in terms of their type of marking:

 dependent-marking has case markers to distinguish the subject and the object, which allows it to use the variant OSV word order without ambiguity. This type usually places adjectives and numerals before the nouns they modify, and is exclusively suffixing without prefixes. SOV languages of this first type include Japanese and Tamil.
 head-marking distinguishes subject and object by affixes on the verb rather than markers on the nouns. It also differs from the dependent-marking SOV language in using prefixes as well as suffixes, usually for tense and possession. Adjectives in this type are much more verb-like than in dependent-marking SOV languages, and hence they usually follow the nouns. In most SOV languages with a significant level of head-marking or verb-like adjectives, numerals and related quantifiers (like "all", "every") also follow the nouns they modify. Languages of this type include Navajo and Seri.

In practice, of course, the distinction between these two types is far from sharp. Many SOV languages are substantially double-marking and tend to exhibit properties intermediate between the two idealised types above.

Many languages that have shifted to SVO word order from earlier SOV retain (at least to an extent) the properties: for example, the Finnish language (high usage of postpositions etc.)

Examples

Albanian 
This sequence (SOV) occurs only in the poetic language.

Azerbaijani

Armenian

Basque 
Basque in short sentences, usually, subject or agent–object–verb; in long sentences, usually, subject or agent-verb-objects):

Bengali

Burmese 
Burmese is an analytic language.

Chinese 
Generally, Chinese varieties all feature SVO word order. However, especially in Standard Mandarin, SOV is tolerated as well. There is even a special particle 把 (bǎ) used to form an SOV sentence.

The following example that uses 把 is controversially labelled as SOV. 把 may be interpreted as a verb, meaning "to hold". However, it does not mean to hold something literally or physically. Rather, the object is held figuratively, and then another verb is acted on the object.

SOV structure is widely used in railway contact in order to clarify the objective of the order.

Dutch 
Dutch is SOV combined with V2 word order. The non-finite verb (infinitive or participle) remains in final position, but the finite (i.e. inflected) verb is moved to the second position. Simple verbs look like SVO, non-finite verbs (participles, infinitives) and compound verbs follow this pattern:

Pure SOV order is found in subordinate clauses:

French 
The French language usually uses a subject–verb–object structure but places proclitics before the verb when using most pronouns, which is sometimes mistaken for SOV word order.

Georgian 
The Georgian language is not extremely rigid with regards to word order, but is typically either SOV or SVO.

German 
German is SOV combined with V2 word order. The non-finite verb (infinitive or participle) remains in final position, but the finite (i.e. inflected) verb is moved to the second position. Simple verbs look like SVO, compound verbs follow this pattern:

The word order changes also depending on whether the phrase is a main clause or a dependent clause. In dependent clauses, the word order is always entirely SOV (cf. also Inversion):

Gothic

Greek (Classical)

Hajong 

re is a particle that indicates the accusative case and 'sei' indicates past tense declarative. Here, e is pronounced as the 'i' in 'girl' and 'ei' is pronounced as the 'ay' in 'say'.

Hindi

Hungarian 
Hungarian word order is free, although the meaning slightly changes. Almost all permutations of the following sample are valid, but with stress on different parts of the meaning.

Italian 
The Italian language usually uses a subject–verb–object structure, but when an enclitic pronoun is used, this comes before the verb and the auxiliary.

Japanese 
The basic principle in Japanese word order is that modifiers come before what they modify. For example, in the sentence "" (Konna yume o mita), the direct object "こんな夢" (this sort of dream) modifies the verb "見た" (saw, or in this case had). Beyond this, the order of the elements in a sentence is relatively free. However, because the topic/subject is typically found in sentence-initial position and the verb is typically in sentence-final position, Japanese is considered an SOV language.
 

A closely-related quality of the language is that it is broadly head-final.

Kannada

Kashmiri 
Like German and Dutch, the Indo-Aryan language Kashmiri is SOV combined with V2 word order. The non-finite verb (infinitive or participle) remains in final position, but the finite (i.e. inflected) part of the verb appears in second position. Simple verbs look like SVO, whereas auxiliated verbs are discontinuous and adhere to this pattern:

Given that Kashmiri is a V2 language, if the word tsũũţh 'apple' comes first then the subject kuur 'girl' must follow the auxiliary chhi 'is': tsũũţh chhi kuur khyevaan [Lit. "Apples is girl eating."]

Also, the word order changes depending on whether the phrase is in a main clause or in certain kinds of dependent clause. For instance, in relative clauses, the word order is SOVAux:

Kazakh 

Like in Japanese, OSV is possible too. (Кітапті Дастан оқыды.)

Korean 

–/– -ga/-i is a particle that indicates the subject. –/– -(r)eul is a particle that indicates the object.
 na "I" is changed to – nae- before – -ga, and the verb stem – yeol- is changed to – yeo- before – -nda.

Kurdish (Kurmanci)

Kurdish (Sorani)

Kyrgyz

Latin 

Classical Latin was an inflected language and had a very flexible word order and sentence structure, but the most usual word order in formal prose was SOV.

Again, there are multiple valid translations (such as "a slave") that do not affect the overall analysis.

Malayalam 

Pustakam̥ + -e = pustakatte (പുസ്തകത്തെ)

Manchu

Marathi

Meitei

Mongolian

Nepali

Odia

Ossetian

Pashto

Persian

Portuguese 
Portuguese is an SVO language, but it has some SOV constructs.

In case of proclisis:

When using a temporal adverb, optionally with the negative:

 

There is an infix construction for the future and conditional tenses:

SVO form: Eu hei-de fazê-lo amanhã or eu farei o mesmo amanhã

Punjabi 
Punjabi may be characterised as following a Subject—Object—Verb typology overall, but some flexibility is permitted, and this tendency does not follow in sentences involving personal pronouns. Examples are shown here in both Shahmukhi (top, right-to-left) and Gurmukhi (bottom, left-to-right). The word forms used reflect those typical of spoken language. For Shahmukhi, vocalised forms with vowel diacritics have been used to explicitly indicate the forms used; in typical writing these are omitted in most words where regular patterns allow this information to be inferred contextually.

The following sentence exhibits the typical SOV word order tendency. The verb phrase is in retrospective perfect participle form, indicating completion of the action, and takes on the feminine plural suffixes in agreement with the gender and number of the object. The subject here is a masculine plural form; in this context it does not require agreement from the verb.

By contrast, in the following sentence the person involved, referred to by a first-person pronoun, is the object rather than the subject. The significance of people as a semantic category takes precedent over the SOV word order tendency, and the person is typically first even in sentences where that person is the object. The pronoun "mainū̃" has the postposition "nū̃" agglutinated to it, approximately meaning "to." Abstract concepts like desires and emotions typically come "to" people as agentive subjects. 

The copula in Punjabi is extraverbal in function. While it can constitute the predicate of a sentence on its own, it does not enter the verb phrase when used alongside a full lexical verb. Instead, it acts as a marker of existence remote to or near to the situation. Some western dialects such as Pothohari have forms of the copula to indicate occurrence of a situation in the future.

Quechua 
Quechuan languages have standard SOV word order. The following example is from Bolivian Quechua.

Sanskrit 
Sanskrit, like its predecessor, Vedic, is an inflected language and very flexible in word order; it allows all possible word combinations. However, it is generally considered a SOV language.

Somali 
Somali generally uses the subject–object–verb structure when speaking formally.

Spanish 
The Spanish language usually uses a subject–verb–object structure, but when an enclitic pronoun is used, this comes before the verb and the auxiliary. Sometimes, in dual-verb constructions involving the infinitive and the gerund, the enclitic pronoun can be put before both verbs, or attached to the end of the second verb.

Talysh

Tamil 
Tamil being a strongly head-final language, the basic word-order is SOV. However, since it is highly inflected, word order is flexible and is used for pragmatic purposes. That is, fronting a word in a sentence adds emphasis on it; for instance, a VSO order would indicate greater emphasis on the verb, the action, than on the subject or the object. However, such word-orders are highly marked, and the basic order remains SOV.

Telugu

Tigrinya 
The Tigrinya language usually uses a subject–verb–object structure.

Turkish 

Like all other Turkic languages, Turkish has flexibility in word order, so any order is possible. For example, in addition to the SOV order above, this sentence could also be constructed as OSV (Elmayı Murat yedi.), OVS (Elmayı yedi Murat.), VSO (Yedi Murat elmayı.), VOS (Yedi elmayı Murat.), or SVO (Murat yedi elmayı.), but these other orders carry a connotation of emphasis of importance on either the subject, object, or the verb. The SOV order is the "default" one that does not connote particular emphasis on any part of the sentence.

Udmurt

Urdu

Uzbek 

The marker "ga" is a dative case marker for the object that precedes it. 
Due to flexibility in word order in Uzbek, it is possible to transform the sentence into OSV as well ("Xivaga Anvar ketdi" / "It was Anvar who went to Khiva").

Yi

Zazaki 
The Zazaki language usually uses a subject–object-verb structure, but it sometimes uses subject-verb-object too.

Zarma

See also
Topic-prominent language
Subject–verb–object
Object–subject–verb
Object–verb–subject
Verb–object–subject
Verb–subject–object
:Category:Subject–object–verb languages

References

 
Word order